Massachusetts House of Representatives' 4th Berkshire district in the United States is one of 160 legislative districts included in the lower house of the Massachusetts General Court. It covers parts of Berkshire County and Hampden County. Democrat Smitty Pignatelli of Lenox has represented the district since 2003.

Towns represented
The district includes the following localities:
 Alford
 Becket
 Blandford
 Egremont
 Great Barrington
 Lee
 Lenox
 Monterey
 Mount Washington
 New Marlborough
 Otis
 Richmond
 Russell
 Sandisfield
 Sheffield
 Stockbridge
 Tolland
 Tyringham
 Washington
 West Stockbridge

The current district geographic boundary overlaps with those of the Massachusetts Senate's 2nd Hampden and Hampshire and Berkshire, Hampshire, Franklin and Hampden districts.

Former locales
The district previously covered:
 Hinsdale, circa 1872 
 Peru, circa 1872 
 Windsor, circa 1872

Representatives
 John Smith, circa 1858 
 Henry D. Lyman, circa 1859 
 William Henry Carey, circa 1888 
 Henry M. Peirson, circa 1888 
 Charles R. Foote, circa 1920 
 John C. Marshall, circa 1920 
 John Glenn Orr, circa 1920 
 Arthur William Milne, circa 1951 
 Dennis J. Duffin, circa 1975 
 Christopher Hodgkins, 1983–2003
 William "Smitty" Pignatelli, 2003-current

See also
 Other Berkshire County districts of the Massachusetts House of Representatives: 1st, 2nd, 3rd
 List of Massachusetts House of Representatives elections
 List of Massachusetts General Courts
 List of former districts of the Massachusetts House of Representatives

Images

References

External links
 Ballotpedia
  (State House district information based on U.S. Census Bureau's American Community Survey).

House
Government of Berkshire County, Massachusetts
Government of Hampden County, Massachusetts